State Highway 58 (SH 58) is a New Zealand state highway in the Wellington Region linking the Hutt Valley to Porirua City.

Route
The road traverses the steep Haywards Hill on the western side of the Hutt Valley, continues through Judgeford to an interchange with the Transmission Gully Motorway (State Highway 1) at Pāuatahanui, and skirts the southern side of the Pauatahanui Inlet of Porirua Harbour and the suburb of Whitby.

History
The road was first formed during the 1870s. From the 1940s to the 1970s there were proposals for a railway line, the Haywards–Plimmerton Line, via this route.

In June 2010 a road assessment programme found that the Haywards Hill road was amongst the worst in the Wellington region, scoring only 2 out a possible 5.
In November 2014 upgrades costing $30 million were announced, with $2.5 million of work starting immediately.
Construction of an elevated interchange at the intersection of SH2 and SH58 at Haywards began in 2015 and was completed in 2017 for a cost of $42 million. The project included a new park and ride car park at the adjacent Manor Park Railway Station and a pedestrian footbridge across SH2 to replace an existing underpass. Further safety improvements are under construction and estimated to be complete by 2023. These include building median and road-side safety barriers, two new roundabouts at the intersections of Flightys Road and Moonshine Road identified as having high crash statistics, and widening parts of the road to four lanes.

Major junctions

See also
 List of New Zealand state highways

References

External links
New Zealand Transport Agency

58
Transport in the Wellington Region